The Parler family was a family of German architects and sculptors from the 14th century. Founder of the dynasty, Heinrich Parler, but later lived and worked in Gmünd. His descendants were working in various parts of central Europe, especially in Bohemia. The family name was derived from the word Parlier, meaning "foreman".

Notable members of the family include:
Heinrich Parler (c. 1300 – c. 1370), also known as Heinrich of Gmünd, founder of the dynasty
Johannes von Gmünd (Johann Parler the Elder) (1330-po 1359), oldest son of Heinrich Parler, father of Michael von Gmünd and Heinrich IV. Parler
Michael von Gmünd (Michael of Freiburg) (c. 1350 - 1387/88), foreman at the Strasbourg Cathedral
Heinrich IV. Parler (Henricus Parlerius, Heinrich Parler the younger), sculptor, founder of the International Gothic style in Prague and Moravia  (1373-1390)
Michael Parler, son of Heinrich Parler, brother of Peter
Peter Parler (1332–1399), son of Heinrich, brother of Michael
Wenzel Parler, son of Peter
Johann Parler, son of Peter, brother of Wenzel

References

Further reading

German architects
Czech architects
Gothic architects
German families
Czech families
German Bohemian people
German-language surnames